John and Nancy Yeatts House is a historic home located near Chatham, Pittsylvania County, Virginia. The log double pen house was built in two sections with the original section built about 1808, and expanded probably in the 1820s but before 1860.  The original section has v-notched logs, a stone gable end chimney, and front and back entries.  The later section is of similar construction and also has a stone gable end chimney.  The two sections are topped by a standing seam metal gable roof.  It is representative of a finely crafted and well-preserved vernacular log dwelling.

It was listed on the National Register of Historic Places in 2009.

References

Houses on the National Register of Historic Places in Virginia
Houses completed in 1808
Houses in Pittsylvania County, Virginia
National Register of Historic Places in Pittsylvania County, Virginia